Pleasant Plains is an unincorporated community in Houston County, Alabama, United States.

History
A post office operated under the name Pleasant Plains from 1885 to 1903.

References

Unincorporated communities in Houston County, Alabama
Unincorporated communities in Alabama